Bad Wilsnack (until 1929 Wilsnack) is a small town in the Prignitz district, in Brandenburg, Germany. The former pilgrimage site of the Holy Blood of Wilsnack has been officially recognised as a spa town (Bad) since 1929. It is the administrative seat of the Amt ("collective municipality") Bad Wilsnack/Weisen.

Geography

The town is situated within the Prignitz historical region in the northwest of Brandenburg, roughly halfway between Berlin and Hamburg. It is located on the Karthane river, which flows into the Elbe at nearby Wittenberge. A few kilometers to the south is the confluence of the Havel and Elbe rivers. The neighbouring municipality of Rühstädt is famous for its high number of resident white storks.

Bad Wilsnack station is a stop on the Berlin–Hamburg Railway. The townscape is marked by the large St Nicholas Church of the Holy Blood and several timber framed houses.

History
Wilsnack in the Margraviate of Brandenburg was first mentioned in 1384. The town became a pilgrimage destination after being burned down on 15 August 1383 during a raid by the Mecklenburg captain and robber baron Heinrich von Bülow against the Bishopric of Havelberg. It was believed that aft the fire some hosts were found to have survived, but had the appearance of being bloodied. The Holy Blood of Wilsnack was authenticated when the Havelberg bishop Dietrich Man went to consecrate the hosts as a precaution, and the central one overflowed with blood, according to later accounts. Reformers like Jan Hus and Nicholas of Cusa later discouraged pilgrimage to Wilsnack, questioning the nature of these wonder hosts and suspecting fraud.

The pilgrimage led from St. Mary's Church in Berlin to Wilsnack. Numerous pilgrims, among them Elector Frederick II of Brandenburg went to the rebuilt town to see the miraculous hosts; their revenues enabled the citizens to construct the large St Nicholas Church for their worship, a larger building than otherwise needed in the parish. The pilgrims who went to Wilsnack bought pewter trinkets to indicate that they had reached the site. These emblems were often in the form of three hosts connected together. Seen in numerous medieval paintings, the tokens have turned up in archaeological digs from the area. The numbers of pilgrims were said to rival those to Santiago de Compostela in Spain. Despite controversy, the pilgrimages continued until 1552, when the hosts were destroyed during the Protestant Reformation.

The story of the bleeding hosts was depicted in a series of woodcuts made during the Middle Ages. The town used the image on emergency money which it printed and issued during the hyperinflation crisis of the 1920s (Notgeld).

Demography

Local council
Elections were held in 2014: 
6 seats: FDP
5 seats: CDU
2 seats: SPD
1 seat: Unabhängige Wählergemeinschaft Grube

Sons and daughters of the town

 Wilhelm Harnisch (1787-1864), theologian and educator
 Otto Reincke (1830-1906), jurist, (Reichsgerichtsrat)
 Christoph Lütgert (born 1945), journalist and author

Individuals connected to the city
 Karl Saur (c.1901 -1978), engineer and former mayor of Bad Wilsnack
 Hugo Spieler (1854-1922), sculptor

References

External links

Chronology and genealogy of Wilsnack

Localities in Prignitz
Catholic pilgrimage sites
Spa towns in Germany